Heydarov, Haidarov, Haydarov, Geydarov, Gaidarov or Gaydarov (masculine) and Heydarova, Haidarova, Haydarova, Geydarova, Gaidarova or Gaydarova (feminine) is a Russian/Azerbaijani surname. It may refer to:

Gaidarov/Gaydarov/Geydarov
Murad Gaidarov (born 1980), Belarusian wrestler 
Georgi Gaydarov (born 1984), Bulgarian footballer
Shakhban Gaydarov (born 1997), Russian football player

Heydarov
Arif Heydarov (1926–1978), Soviet Azerbaijani state figure and a General-Lieutenant
Hidayat Heydarov (born 1997), Azerbaijani judoka
Kamaladdin Heydarov (born 1961), Azerbaijani composer and politician
Tale Heydarov (born 1985), Azerbaijani revolutionary and statesman

See also
Haydar
Haydarov

Azerbaijani-language surnames
Patronymic surnames
Surnames from given names